Antonio de León Cubillo Ferreira (3 June 1930 – 10 December 2012) was a Canarian Independentist, politician, lawyer and militant of the Canary Islands.

Biography 
Cubillo was born on 3 June 1930 in San Cristóbal de La Laguna. He was married and had three children. He received a law degree from the University of La Laguna.

Cubillo founded the Canary Islands Independence Movement in 1963. While exiled in Algiers, escaping the Francoist dictatorial regime, he began a campaign to gain Canary Islands independence from Spanish rule in the late 1970s.  In 1978, he was crippled in an assassination attempt linked to the security forces of the Spanish Ministry of the Interior.

After the Canary Islands Independence Movement was disbanded in 1982 following the creation of the Canary Islands Autonomous Community, Cubillo was able to return to Spain and founded the National Congress of the Canaries, a democratic party, in 1985. In 2002, the Supreme Court of Spain recognized that the Government of Spain committed state terrorism against Cubillo in the 1978 assassination attempt and paid him damages as a result, the first time the State officially recognized it engaged in crimes against civilians. In 2011, a documentary called Cubillo: The Story of a State Crime was shown on national television highlighting the role of the State.

Cubillo's core claims were that the Canary Islands could be better off if it could keep and develop more of its resources and thus maintain greater autonomy from Madrid. He claimed that the resources are considerable in terms of tourism, geo-political locations for maritime traffic development, fishing fields, oil fields and natural energy resources. The movement he founded, however, failed to attract public support among Canarios owing to its violent nature. The organizations that have succeeded Canary Islands Independence Movement, such as the Popular Front of the Canary Islands (FREPIC), have remained largely marginal.

Cubillo died on 10 December 2012 at age 82 at his home in Santa Cruz de Tenerife. He was buried in the Cementerio de Santa Lastenia in the same city.

References 

1930 births
2012 deaths
20th-century Spanish lawyers
People imprisoned on charges of terrorism
People from San Cristóbal de La Laguna
Canarian nationalists
Canarian independence activists